Michael Tambak (born 1 January 1992) is a Dutch footballer who plays for Belgian Eerste Provinciale Limburg club SV Herkol.

In the 2011–12 season he played for MVV Maastricht. He made his professional debut against Almere City in the Eerste Divisie. From mid-2013 to the end of 2014 he played for Patro Eisden. He played for RWS Bruxelles in the first half of 2015. Thereafter, Tambak played for KVK Wellen (2015–16), Spouwen-Mopertingen (2016–17), KFC Helson Helchteren (2017–19) and Park FC Houthalen (2019–20). He moved to SV Herkol in 2020.

References

1992 births
Living people
Dutch footballers
Footballers from Maastricht
Association football forwards
Alemannia Aachen players
MVV Maastricht players
Roda JC Kerkrade players
K. Patro Eisden Maasmechelen players
RWS Bruxelles players
Belgian Third Division players
Dutch expatriate footballers
Expatriate footballers in Germany
Expatriate footballers in Belgium
Dutch expatriate sportspeople in Germany
Dutch expatriate sportspeople in Belgium